Marstonia agarhecta, common name Ocmulgee marstonia, is a species of freshwater snail with a gill and an operculum, aquatic gastropod mollusk in the family Hydrobiidae.

This species is endemic to Georgia, the United States. Its natural habitat is rivers. It is threatened by habitat loss.

References

Molluscs of the United States
Hydrobiidae
Gastropods described in 1969
Taxonomy articles created by Polbot